Dieppe station (French: Gare de Dieppe) is the train station for the town of Dieppe, Seine-Maritime and was built by Chemins de fer de Paris à Cherbourg on 28 July 1848. It used to have a direct connection with Paris-St. Lazare via Serqueux and Gisors, but this line was closed in 2006. Along with Dieppe-Port, it was a stop on the trains from Paris to London via Newhaven. The station is now the terminus of a line from Paris via Rouen.

Services

The station is served by fast and local trains to Rouen.

References

External links
 

Railway stations in France opened in 1848
Railway stations in Seine-Maritime
Gare